Sidney Hadden (26 August 1877 – 2 November 1934) was an English cricketer.  Hadden's batting style is unknown, but it is known he fielded as a wicket-keeper.  He was born at Hastings, Sussex.

He made his first-class debut for Essex against Derbyshire in the 1912 County Championship.  He made three further first-class appearances in 1912, following World War I he made two further appearances for Essex in the 1920 County Championship against Gloucestershire and Middlesex.  In his total of six first-class appearances, he scored 29 runs at an average of 9.66, with a high score of 17 not out.  Behind the stumps he took 5 catches and made a single stumping.

Hadden died at Whipps Cross, Essex on 2 November 1934.

References

External links
Sid Hadden at ESPNcricinfo
Sid Hadden at CricketArchive

1877 births
1934 deaths
Sportspeople from Hastings
English cricketers
Essex cricketers
Wicket-keepers